
The White Rose College of the Arts & Humanities (WRoCAH) is a doctoral training partnership between the Universities of Leeds, Sheffield and York, who are members of the White Rose University Consortium, formed in 2013.

WRoCAH funds doctoral research and provides training for doctoral researchers in the arts and humanities at the three institutions through funding from the three universities and the Arts and Humanities Research Council with support from 16 core partner organisations. Recipients collaborate between the three universities, present and discuss their research with the public and policy-makers, and also complete a project with an organisation, intended as an introduction to working after completion of the doctorate as well as a benefit to the organisation.  WRoCAH offered 50 openings per year, to students from any European Union country;  it was funding more than 500 postgraduates.

Core partners

Museums, galleries, archives and libraries
The British Library
The National Archives (United Kingdom)
The National Media Museum
The National Railway Museum
The Royal Armouries
The Victoria and Albert Museum

Arts and heritage organizations
The Arts Council
English Heritage

Creative industries
CidaCo
Continuum Attractions

Design, manufacturing and retail
Marks & Spencer
Microsoft

Publishing and performing arts
Maney Publishing
Opera North

Media
Carm Productions and Strategy
Reel Solutions

Charities and Public Sector
Sheffield Health & Social Care NHS Foundation Trust
The Young Foundation

References

External links 
 White Rose College of the Arts & Humanities
 White Rose College of the Arts & Humanities to nurture next generation of skilled researchers - Press release 15/10/2013
 Universities to invest £23m in new College of Arts and Humanities - Yorkshire Post 16 October 2013
 AHRC DTP Directors Conference Presentation
 White Rose Postgraduate Philosophy Forum
 AHRC Doctoral Training Partnerships
 English Heritage - Doctoral Training Partnerships
 Scholarships at the University of Sheffield

College and university associations and consortia in the United Kingdom
University of Sheffield
University of York
University of Leeds